The Rugby League Victory Cup is a rugby league tournament held in Russia between its national team and those of France, the USA and a British amateur side.  Officially it is organised and funded by the Russian Rugby Football League (RRFL); unofficially, the 2003 and 2004 tournaments were largely run by the RRFL's then president, Akhmet Kamaldinov, who had more to do with the organisation and especially the funding than any other person employed by the RRFL.

The Tournament was initially dedicated to the anniversary of the "Victory" of World War II. All teams competing in the first two competitions were allies during the war.

With Kamaldinov departing as president of the RRFL in early 2005, the Victory Cup underwent some major adjustment. The tournament is to be held as a sevens tournament and has been renamed to the Victory Sevens. It was hoped that the tournament be named the World Sevens since the demise of that competition just a year or two ago. Those plans have seem to have fallen through.

See also

List of rugby league competitions

References

External links
 News Archive Dating Back to the VCs Inception - World of Rugby League

European rugby league competitions